Chah Narenj (also Romanized as Chāh Nārenj; also known as ‘Abbāsābād) is a village in Hur Rural District, in the Central District of Faryab County, Kerman Province, Iran. At the 2006 census, its population was 392, in 85 families.

References 

Populated places in Faryab County